WODY (1160 kHz) is a non-commercial radio station licensed to Fieldale, Virginia, serving Martinsville and Henry County, Virginia.  WODY is owned and operated by Positive Alternative Radio, Inc.  It simulcasts a Southern Gospel radio format from WXRI Winston-Salem, North Carolina, as part of the Joy FM network. It formerly aired programming from ESPN Radio before being bought by Positive Alternative Radio.  The network is listener-supported, with the stations holding on-air fundraisers to support the Joy FM ministry.

By day, WODY is powered at 5,000 watts non-directional.  But because it broadcasts on the United States clear-channel frequency of 1160 AM, reserved for KSL in Salt Lake City, WODY must reduce power at night to only 250 watts and use a directional antenna to avoid interference.  Programming is also heard on FM translator W264CM at 100.7 MHz in Martinsville, Virginia.

Translator
In addition to the main station, WODY is relayed by an FM translator to widen its broadcast area.

References

External links
Joy FM

ODY
Radio stations established in 1993
1993 establishments in Virginia